Earby is a civil parish in Pendle, Lancashire, England.  It contains five listed buildings that are recorded in the National Heritage List for England.  Of these, one is at Grade II*, the middle grade, and the others are at Grade II, the lowest grade.  The parish contains the small town of Earby, and is otherwise rural.  The listed buildings comprise two farmhouses, a house in the town, a public house, and a former school.

Key

Buildings

References

Citations

Sources

Lists of listed buildings in Lancashire
Buildings and structures in the Borough of Pendle